Frank's Place is an American comedy-drama series that aired on CBS for 22 episodes during the 1987-1988 television season. The series was created by Hugh Wilson and executive produced by Wilson and series star and fellow WKRP in Cincinnati alumnus Tim Reid.

TV Guide ranked it  No. 3 on its 2013 list of 60 shows that were "Cancelled Too Soon". Rolling Stone ranked it No. 99 on its list of the best sitcoms of the television era.

Plot
Set in New Orleans, Frank's Place chronicles the life of Frank Parrish (Tim Reid), a well-to-do African-American professor at Brown University, an Ivy League university in Providence, Rhode Island, who inherits a restaurant, Chez Louisiane. In the premiere, Frank travels to New Orleans intending to sell the restaurant. However, waitress Emerita (she waits only on customers with twenty years or more of patronage) of Chez Louisiane—Miss Marie (Frances E. Williams) has a voodoo spin (curse) put on Frank ensuring that he will come back to carry on his family's business. Consequently, when Frank returns to New England, the life he's known there suddenly goes inexplicably haywire. Feeling he has no choice, Frank returns to New Orleans and makes many discoveries about black culture in New Orleans, the differences between northern and southern lifestyles, and himself.

On its surface, Frank's Place was a fish-out-of-water story, like The Beverly Hillbillies or Green Acres. However, the series' story lines featured weightier topics such as race and class issues.

Cast and characters
 Tim Reid as Frank Parrish
 Daphne Maxwell Reid (Tim Reid's real-life wife) as Hanna Griffin
 Tony Burton as Big Arthur
 Virginia Capers as Mrs. Bertha Griffin-Lamour
 Robert Harper as Bubba Weisberger
 Lincoln Kilpatrick as Reverend Deal
 Charles Lampkin as Tiger Shepin
 Francesca P. Roberts as Anna Mae
 Don Yesso as Shorty La Roux
 William Thomas Jr. as Cool Charles
 Frances E. Williams as Miss Marie, oldest living waitress

Production
The idea for the series came from CBS vice president, Gregg Maday. As a young man, Maday frequented a restaurant in Buffalo, New York named Dan Montgomery's. Maday also wanted a series based in New Orleans due to the mid-1980s interest in Cajun cuisine and zydeco. The two ideas were combined. Wilson and Reid spent time in New Orleans for research. They found a restaurant named Chez Helene, and many of the things they encountered there were included in the series. Big Arthur was based on Chez Helene's owner, Austin Leslie. The series focused more on Creole cuisine and Creole culture rather than Cajun.

Don Yesso was a real-life New Orleans native whom Wilson met on a flight to the city. Yesso was not an actor, but Wilson cast him because of his genuine Yat dialect.

Unlike most sitcom productions of the era, Frank's Place was filmed with a single camera and used no laugh track.

Theme song
The series theme song was Louis Armstrong's classic "Do You Know What It Means To Miss New Orleans?".

Episodes

Awards and nominations

Cancellation
Frank's Place was cancelled after one season. Despite its strong beginning, ratings for Frank's Place declined. Viewers were reportedly puzzled by the show's changing timeslot and by how the show's style eschewed the traditional sitcom format. The show's large ensemble and film-style techniques made production costly. Wilson remarked that: "We just didn’t please the Nielsen monster."

Tim Reid was later told by CBS board member Walter Cronkite that the show was cancelled because Laurence Tisch, the network's CEO at the time, was upset by the episode "The King of Wall Street."  Tisch, who bought CBS via junk bonds, viewed the episode as an insult since it depicted a Wall Street tycoon condemning junk bonds.  As a result, Tisch demanded that the show be cancelled despite the objections of Cronkite and other board members.

Syndication
Reruns aired on BET in 1990.

Home media
In October 2008, CNN.com reported that because of music clearance issues, a DVD release would be unlikely. However, on November 11, 2008, TVShowsOnDVD.com reported that plans are underway for an eventual DVD release, although Tim Reid has said that, due to the prohibitive costs of the music rights,  a new musical score will be recorded that will "recreate the mood of the music."  He adds, "it has to be the mood of the show or I'd rather not do it."  No date has been yet given for a release.

Notes

References

External links
 
Frank's Place entry from The Museum of Broadcast Communications

1987 American television series debuts
1988 American television series endings
1980s American comedy-drama television series
1980s American sitcoms
1980s American black sitcoms
CBS original programming
English-language television shows
Television series by CBS Studios
Television shows set in New Orleans
Television series set in restaurants
Television series created by Hugh Wilson
Fiction about curses